Golia is a village located in the Ganjam District of the Indian state of Odisha. It is governed by a panchayat, which also governs several nearby villages, and is famous for the large number of turtles in Nelia Pond beside the temple of Shiva.

Climate 

Golia has a tropical wet and dry climate.

Demographics 
According to the 2001 Census of India, the population of Golia was 4688, consisting of 2312 males and 2376 females. The literacy rate of Golia is 74.45%, which is slightly higher than the National average of 74.04%. As of 2011, the total number of voters in the village was 3121. It is surrounded by Polasara Tehsil to the south, Jagantha Prasad Tehsil to the north, Bellaguntha Tehsil to the west, and Bhanjanager Tehsil to the east. Its neighboring villages are Chirikipada, Kusapali, DahaniPali, Saturusola, Mareyapali, Mala, Lembhu Bagicha, and Badua. The village is very dependent on towns such as Buguda, Polasara, Aska, Chatrapura, Berhampur, Purusotampur, and Jaganath Prasad.

Education 
Golia is an education hub for nearby villages, which stretch from Mareyepoli and Kusapali to Kuanala. Multiple students from neighboring villages attend schools in the village to learn and improve their future prospects. Several educational organizations are present in the village:

 Golia Primary School
 Nua Sahi Sarkari Prathamika Vidayalya
 Upendra Bhanja ME School
 Sri Kanta Swamy Tapobana High School. 

Golia's Anganwadi Kendra childcare center plays a major role in raising awareness of the value of children's education in the village. Parents are encouraged to allow their children to participate in extra-curricular activities. Thus, some children move to nearby towns like Buguda, Polasara, and Asika for a better education and to study English.

Sources of income 
There are no industries currently in this area, and most families are farmers. Golia is known for its fertile soil and agricultural productivity. Most people in the village depend greatly on their land and gardens. Farmers are dependent on rain-fed agriculture and climate sensitive variables. Varieties of crops such as rice, dal, sugar cane, oil seed, mung, and biri are cultivated by farmers. People who want to make more money often leave the village for better opportunities. Industrial cities like Surat (known as "The Diamond City"), which is known for implementing child labour to process rough Conflict Diamonds from Africa, and Mumbai (known as "The Dream City") are two common destinations for the people of Golia.

Local and state government workers are also present in the village, including teachers, civil servants (such as police officers and people employed in the army, air force, or navy), doctors, nurses, and pharmacists.

See also 

 List of constituencies of Odisha Vidhan Sabha
 Oriya language

References 

 2001 census of India Ganjam nic, and Map of Golia
 Department of education Primary Education, & Ministry of Drinking Water and Sanitation .
 Odisha Tourism tourist places in Odisha, & Ganjam Tourism & Tourist places in Ganjam.
 Street Food: Samosa
 Sports and games liked by children in Odisha
 District Rural Development Agency PDF

External links 
Golia Panchayat
Golia In Google Map
Location of Golia, Odisha, India on Map
Jaganath Temple In Ganajm
GANJAM District – Buguda Block – Golia Panchayat – Golia Information
Population of India
Schools in Golia
Upendra Bhanja U.P.S, Golia

Villages in Ganjam district